The 2011 Johnstown Generals season was the first season for the Ultimate Indoor Football League (UIFL) franchise. The Generals were able to finish the season with a 6-8 record, and failed to qualify for the playoffs.

The Generals season began with the first overall pick in the 2011 UIFL Draft. The Generals selected Victor Seasy with that pick.

Schedule
Key:

Regular season

Standings

Final roster

References

Johnstown Generals
Johnstown Generals
2011 in sports in Pennsylvania